are Japanese yōkai of pregnant women. Throughout folk stories and literature the identity and appearance of ubume varies. However, she is most commonly depicted as the spirit of a woman who has died during childbirth. Passersby will see her as a normal-looking woman carrying a baby. She will typically try to give the passerby her child then disappear. When the person goes to look at the child in their arms, they discover it is only a bundle of leaves or large rock. The idea that pregnant women who die and get buried become "ubume" has existed since ancient times; which is why it has been said that when a pregnant woman dies prepartum, one ought to cut the fetus out the abdomen and put it on the mother in a hug as they are buried. In some regions, if the fetus cannot be cut out, a doll would be put beside her.

Variations 

In the 16th volume, first half of the Miscellaneous Morsels from Youyang of the Tang dynasty, volume 462 of the Taiping Guangji of Northern Song dynasty, the "night-going leisure woman" is a nocturnal strange bird that steals peoples' babies and about it is written, "perhaps it is the changed form of what was once someone who died in childbirth". In Japan, they would often wear a blood-stained koshimaki, embrace children and chase after people who accompany them. They are also mentioned in the Hyakumonogatari Hyōban ("They are women who died upon childbirth, and became this due to attachment. In appearance, they are stained with blood below the waist, and they are said to cry out, "obareu, obareu"), the Kii Zōdan Shū ("the ubume does not give childbirth, and if only the fetus had life, such a deep delusion of the mother remains, and thus they change to this and embraces a child at night. It's said when the child cries, the ubume does too"), the Compendium of Materia Medica, and the Wakan Sansai Zue. The ubume's blood-soaked appearance is thought to be because in feudal society, the continuation of the family was considered important, so pregnant women who died were believed to fall into a hell with a pond of blood.

Ubume in Hinoemata, Minamiaizu District and Kaneyama, Ōnuma District, Fukushima Prefecture were called "obo". It is said that when they encounter someone, they make that person hug a baby and then disappear in peace and the one hugging the baby will have their throat bitten by the baby. It is said that when one encounters an obo, throwing a piece of cloth, such as a string with a billhook attached for men, or a gōkōsō (a type of women's handkerchief), tenugui, or a yumaki (a type of waistcloth) for women, it would divert the obo's attention and create an opportunity to escape. It is also said that if one does end up hugging the baby, hugging the baby with its face facing the other way would result in not being bit. Also, the "obo" is, like the "ubu" in "ubume", originally a dialect term referring to newborns. In Yanaizu, Kawanuma District, there is a legend centered on the "obo" called the "obo hugging Kannon".

In the Nishimatsuura District, Saga Prefecture and in Miyamachi Miyaji, Aso, Kumamoto Prefecture, they are called "ugume" and it is said that they appear at night and they would make people embrace a baby a night, but when dawn comes, they would generally be a rock, a stone tower, or a straw beater. (On Goshōra island in Nagasaki Prefecture, also in Kyushu, there is a type of funayūrei called "ugume".)

In the Iki region of Nagasaki Prefecture, they are called "unme" or "uume" and they occur when a young person dies or when a woman dies from difficult childbirth, and they would sway back and forth before disappearing, having the appearance of a creepy blue light.

In Ibaraki Prefecture, there are legends of a yōkai called the "ubametori" and when children go dry their clothes a night, this ubametori would think of the child as their own, and give some poisonous milk. This has some similarities to a similar wrathful spirit called a kokakuchō and nowadays specialists infer that Ibaraki's ubametori is the same as this kokakuchō, and furthermore, kokakuchō is theorized to be the changed form of a pregnant mother's spirit, so it is said that this mysterious bird is considered the same as ubume. Also, the ubume in Japanese legends is a bird that resembles the gull in appearance and voice and it is said that they would land on the ground and shapeshift into a woman carrying a baby and they would request "please hold on to this child" to people they meet and those that flee would be cursed with chills and fevers and eventually death. In Iwaki Province, now Fukushima Prefecture and Miyagi Prefecture, it is said that ryūtō (an atmospheric ghost light said to be lit by a dragon spirit) would appear at beaches and try to come up to land, but it is said that this is because an ubume is carrying a ryūtō to the shore. In Kitaazumi District, Nagano Prefecture, ubume are called yagomedori, and they are said to stop at clothes drying at night, and it is said that putting on those clothes would result in dying before one's husband.

Social and cultural influence 
The yokai ubume was conceived through various means of social and religious influence. During the late Medieval period of Japan, the attitudes surrounding motherhood started to change. Rather than the infant being considered a replication of the mother and an extension of her body, the fetus started to be seen as separate from the mother. This distancing of mother and fetus caused an emphasis on the paternal ownership of the child, reducing the mother to nothing more than a vessel for male reproduction. For a mother to die in childbirth or late pregnancy soon came to be considered a sin, the blame for the death of the unborn child being placed on the mother who in a sense was responsible for the infant's death (Stone & Walter p. 176).

In folklore
Originally the name for a kind of small sea fish, in Japanese folklore the term is now applied to the ghost of a woman who had died in childbirth, or "birthing woman ghost".

Typically, the ubume asks a passerby to hold her child for just a moment and disappears when her victim takes the swaddled baby. The baby then becomes increasingly heavy until it is impossible to hold. It is then revealed not to be a human child at all, but a boulder or a stone image of Jizō.

Many scholars have associated the ubume with the legend of the hitobashira, where a sacrificial mother and child "are buried under one of the supporting pillars of a new bridge."

The Shoshin'in Temple, according to scholars, is where local women come to pray to conceive a child or to have a successful pregnancy. According to Stone and Walter (2008), the origins of the temple's legend, set in the mid-16th century, concern:

a modern statue of Ubume, displayed once a year in July. At this festival, candy that has been offered to the image is distributed, and women pray for safe delivery and for abundant milk. The statue, which is clothed in white robes, has only a head, torso, and arms; it has no lower half.

In literature
Stories about ubume have been told in Japan since at least the 12th century.

The early 17th-century tale collection Konjaku hyaku monogatari hyoban  says of the ubume:

When a woman loses her life in childbirth, her spiritual attachment (shūjaku) itself becomes this ghost. In form, it is soaked in blood from the waist down and wanders about crying, ‘Be born! Be born!’ (obareu, obareu).

Natsuhiko Kyogoku's best-selling detective novel, The Summer of the Ubume, uses the ubume legend as its central motif, creating something of an ubume 'craze at the time of its publication and was made into a major motion picture in 2005.

In art
Tokugawa-era artists produced many images of ubume, usually represented as "naked from the waist up, wearing a red skirt and carrying a small baby."

Other illustrations of ubume are from Toriyama Sekien’s late-18th-century encyclopedia of ghosts, goblins, and ghouls, Gazu Hyakki Yagyō.

See also
Harpy
Konaki-jiji, a childlike yōkai that, like the ubume's bundled 'infant', grows heavier when carried and ultimately takes the form of a boulder.
Myling, an example of a similar motif in Scandinavian folklore.
Pontianak
Sankai, yōkai that emerge from pregnant women

Notes

References

Further reading
Iwasaka, Michiko and Barre Toelken. Ghosts And The Japanese: Cultural Experience in Japanese Death Legends. (1994)
Kyogoku, Natsuhiko. The Summer of the Ubume. San Francisco: Viz Media. (2009)
Wakita, Haruko. Women in medieval Japan: motherhood, household management and sexuality. Monash Asia Institute. (2006)

Ubume
Japanese ghosts
Japanese folklore
Yōkai
Female legendary creatures